The 2009 Motocross des Nations took place after the 2009 FIM Motocross World Championship season, on October 4, 2009 in Franciacorta, Italy.

Entry list 
All entries taken from the official MX Nations site.

Note 1 : Ukraine did not participate.

Qualifying

Qualifyied countries

Countries admitted to the B Final

Non-qualifyied countries

B Final 

Note 1 : Ireland won the B final which meant they qualified for the main races.

Race

References 

Motocross des Nations
Motocross